"Princess" is a song by Australian pop punk band, Short Stack. It was released in February 2009 as the second single from their debut studio album, Stack Is the New Black.

Music video

A music video for this single takes place in the same white room for the entire duration of the video. It showcases all three members of Short Stack playing their music meanwhile being surrounded by people dancing dressed up in various animal suits such as a rabbit and bear. Two other people are also spotted in the video, one being dressed in an Elvis inspired costume and the other in a Mexican costume. Towards the end of the video, the lead singer, Shaun Diviney results in hooking up with the person in the rabbit suit as well as himself.

Track listings

Charts

Weekly charts

Year-end charts

References

2009 singles
Short Stack songs
2009 songs